After Adolf Hitler came into power in 1933, Jews began to escape German-occupied Europe.

Germany and Austria

In 1933, Hitler and the Jewish League agreed to the Haavara Agreement in which, over time, German Jews and their finances could and would settle in Mandatory Palestine. Furthermore, the Havaara Mark was used instead of the Deutschmark, because of its lower interest rates, and it was seen as more favourable. By the end of 1933, of the 600,000 German Jews, 100,000 had already emigrated to Palestine. Following this, they discouraged emigration by restricting the amount of money Jews could take from German banks and imposed high emigrations taxes. The German government forbade emigration from the Greater Germanic Reich after October 1941. The German Jews who remained, about 163,000 in Germany and less than 57,000 from annexed Austria, were mostly elderly who were murdered in ghettos or taken to Nazi concentration camps, where most were murdered. Jews were able to leave Vichy France until the fall of 1942.

Although Jews could initially leave Nazi Germany with ease, it was difficult to find countries that would take them, particularly after the initial wave of immigrants in Europe, Britain, and the United States had been accepted. One of the reasons that emigration was so difficult was that it began during the Great Depression. 
Following the Anschluss, the annexation of Austria to Germany in 1938, and forced emigration deepened the refugee crisis, the Évian Conference was held in France to explore options for countries to emigrate to, but the key outcome of the conference was that it proved that forced emigration would not solve the problem. Another was a concern that there might be pro-Nazi spies among the refugees.

It was also difficult to get out of Europe. After the war started, there were few ships that left European ports. Lisbon was a neutral port, however, from which refugees could still travel.

Occupied countries

Denmark

In October 1943, 7,000 Danish Jews, and 700 of their relatives who were not Jewish, escaped Nazi-occupied Denmark for neutral Sweden, as was coordinated by the Danish resistance movement. They travelled to Malmö, Sweden across the Øresund Channel.

France, Luxembourg, Belgium, and The Netherlands
Many of the French, Luxembourgian, Belgian, and Dutch Jews were protected by their Country's resistances, hid in secret locations that were hard to find for the Nazis, and fled to the United Kingdom, Free France (Algeria), Sweden, Switzerland, Spain, Portugal, Canada, and the United States.

Germany and Austria
Hitler came to power in Germany in 1933, when there were about 523,000 German Jews (<1% of the population) in the country. Subject to threats and persecution, Jews began to emigrate from that point until the start of World War II. In Austria, more than 50% of the Jews had left the country by May 1939, following Adolf Eichmann's program to force Jews to emigrate that began in the spring of 1938. Franz Mayer, a Jewish leader, said of Eichmann's system:  "You put in a Jew at one end, with property, a shop, a bank account, and legal rights. He passed through the building and came out at the other end without property, without privileges, without rights, with nothing except a passport and order to leave the country within a fortnight; otherwise, he would find himself inside a concentration camp." By the end of 1939, there were more than 117,000 Jews who left Austria and more than 300,000 who left Germany. Most of them were trained in a particular field or college-educated. Generally, they were young in age.

Many of the 100,000 people who found refuge in neighbouring European countries, like the Netherlands, Belgium, and France, were captured and murdered by the Nazis, after May 1940, when they invaded western Europe. As the Nazi regime occupied Czechoslovakia, beginning in 1938, and invaded Poland in 1939, there were more Jewish refugees.

Norway
After the German occupation of Norway in 1940, some Norwegian Jews were able to find a safe haven in Sweden, which was neutral. However, over half of the Norwegian Jews were rounded up by Quisling regime police and handed over to the Reichskommissariat Norwegen.

Poland
Jews were prevented from leaving German-occupied Poland by the Schutzstaffel (SS). About 10% of the Polish Jewish population, together with 1 million Poles in total, were rounded up by the Russians and sent to Siberia in intolerable circumstances. Many died from harsh treatment at the hands of the Russians from 1939 and 1943 and onwards. Other Jews were spared harsh treatment, however, and some were trained in Moscow, so as to be fit to command a new Polish government after the war was over. Some of them were sent to remote areas of the Soviet Union, Siberia, or Central Asia.

Soviet Union
Jews were systematically murdered as part of the Final Solution plan, starting with their removal to extermination camps and beginning in June 1941 Germany invaded the Soviet Union, and those who were unable to flee to the Asian parts of the country were methodically shot. By the end of the war, 67% of the Jews from Europe had been murdered.

Countries that offered refuge

Continental Europe

Despite pressure from Germany, Fascist Italy protected Jewish people in lands that it occupied in Greece, France, Dalmatia, Croatia, and Yugoslavia, as well as protecting Jews in Tunisia, between mid-1942 and September 1943.

About 30,000 Jews entered Portugal through Spain, and many sought passage in Lisbon on ships bound for the Americas. The refugees were assisted by French and American Jewish organizations. Most travelled between 1939 and 1941, and after Germans pressured the country to limit Jews ability to travel through their country, from 1942 to 1944 there were about 7,500 people who were admitted entry to Spain for Portugal. Spanish consuls also provided identity papers so that up to 5,000 people could escape through other parts of Europe.

Sweden took in Jews from Norway and Denmark.

The Swiss took in nearly 30,000 Jews, yet also turned away 20,000 at their border.

Elsewhere

Dominican Republic
In July 1938, the Dominican Republic was the only country at the Évian Conference that said it would admit a large number of refugees. President Rafael Trujillo did this partially to deflect international criticism of mass killings of Haitian refugees in the Parsley massacre. Between 1938 and 1941, Bolivia allowed for 30,000 refugees to immigrate to its country.

Palestine
Mandatory Palestine was a destination for 18,000 Jews escaping the Nazi regime through the Balkans between 1937 and 1944. This was organized by the Zionist movement. There were more than 16,000 Jews who later were bound for Palestine on boats from the Romanian and Bulgarian ports on the Black Sea and often through Turkey for refueling. One ship, MV Struma, was sunk, presumably accidentally, by a Soviet Navy submarine, in what is referred to as the Struma disaster.

United Kingdom

United States

The United States had about 27,000 available visas in late 1938 for individuals for refugees. At that time,  consulate offices outside the US were visited by 125,000 applicants, and by June 1939, there had been more than 300,000 applicants. This was far more than the US would allow into the country due to its immigration policy. The MS St. Louis sailed from Hamburg, Germany for Cuba, who had issued transit visas for more than 900 Jewish refugees, on a voyage that occurred from May to June 1939. Once the ship had arrived, the Cubans cancelled the refugees' visas. The ship was denied permission to land in the United States and it had to make a return voyage to Europe. Of 928 returning passengers, 288 were accepted by Britain, 366 survived the war on the continent, and 254 were murdered during the Holocaust. In 1944, the War Refugee Board (WRB) was established to assist tens of thousands of refugees, in coordination with the World Jewish Congress and the American Jewish Joint Distribution Committee, and an emergency shelter was established at Fort Ontario in New York, which housed almost 1,000 refugees.

China 

Approximately 20,000 European Jewish refugees settled in the Republic of China, which already had a substantial expatriate population, during the 1930s and the 1940s. Many of them established businesses, decided to remain in the country permanently, and even acquired Chinese citizenship. Almost all of them fled during the Chinese Civil War and the Communist Revolution, with most Jewish expatriates being evacuated from Shanghai to Israel beginning in 1948.

Organizations and individuals that offered relief
Organizations were established to assist refugees, like the World Jewish Congress, the Jewish Agency for Palestine, and the American Jewish Joint Distribution Committee. There were few non-Jews that helped the Jews escape, but there were some that risked their lives for the cause. Such people were later amongst what became known as the Righteous Among the Nations.

After the war

In May 1945, European Jews were released from concentration camps or came out of hiding, to find that they had lost family members and their former homes. The population of displaced persons also included more than 150,000 Jews who had left Central and Eastern Europe due to violence and anti-Semitism. Countries continued to resist taking in Jews, however. The most favourable destinations for the displaced Jews were Palestine and the United States; in the latter, President Harry S. Truman issued the "Truman Directive," on 22 December 1945, and up to 40,000 Jews entered the United States by 1 July 1948. That year, a law was enacted by Congress that increased immigration quotas to allow in approximately 80,000 Jews, who were subject to what Truman called "flagrantly discriminatory" entry qualifications. About 102,000 forced labourers and other individuals from the Baltics and Eastern Europe, who were Christians, were also allowed to be admitted to the US. There were 137,450 Jewish refugees who settled in the United States between 1945 and 1952.

On 14 May 1948, the State of Israel was founded during the 1947–1949 Palestine war, and many Jews settled there.

See also 
 History of the Jews during World War II
 Jews escaping from Nazi Europe to Britain
 Timeline of the Holocaust

Notes

References

Sources

External links
Der Ausweg (B23), a 1934-1935 periodical for German-Jewish refugees with information about emigrating out of Nazi Germany, at the Leo Baeck Institute, New York  

 
The Holocaust